Granwald Scott (born 28 November 1987) is a South African association football midfielder who plays for Cape Town Spurs.

He hails from Kensington on the Cape Flats.

Career

Club career
On 24 December 2019 it was confirmed that Scott had joined Stellenbosch.

References

External links
 
 

1987 births
Living people
Sportspeople from Cape Town
South African soccer players
Association football midfielders
Cape Town Spurs F.C. players
ŠK Slovan Bratislava players
Bidvest Wits F.C. players
Stellenbosch F.C. players
South African Premier Division players
Slovak Super Liga players
Cape Coloureds
South Africa international soccer players
South African expatriate soccer players
Expatriate footballers in Slovakia
South African expatriate sportspeople in Slovakia